The Armenian–Parthian War or Parthian conquest of Tigran (88-86 BCE) refers to when the armies of Tigranes the Great victoriously entered Northern Mesopotamia and the kingdoms of Osroene and Atropatene pledged their loyalty and support to Tigranes the Great. Many rulers and kings of the time called Tigranes, the "Kings of Kings" because of his wealth and power.

References

Sources 
  
 
 
 
 
 
 
  
 
 
 

Wars involving Armenia
Kingdom of Armenia (antiquity)
Wars involving the Parthian Empire
Military history of Armenia
80s BC conflicts
1st century BC